The Yontocket massacre or Burnt Ranch massacre was an 1853 massacre of Tolowa people at the village of Yontocket (Tolowa: yan'-daa-k'vt), northwestern California.

Before the event 

The Tolowa Tribe, or the Taa-laa-wa Dee-ni' is a Native American tribe from northwestern California and southern Oregon. In the Spring of 1853, a group of prospectors headed by a man by the name of "California Jack" started from Crescent City on a prospecting journey. They planned to go to a place near the Smith River. Not long after, a Native American was spotted in town carrying a pistol with the name "California Jack" engraved on it. Believing that the prospectors had been killed by the Native Americans, a group of townspeople attacked the Native Americans at Battery Point. They killed the Native American who had the pistol and several others in the area. They immediately began to assemble a search party to look for the men's camp and bodies. When they found them, they became increasingly more angry. After the killing of the Native Americans at Battery Point, a large number of the Tolowa survivors fled to a rancheria (a small Native American settlement) close to the mouth of Smith's River. The rancheria was known as Yontocket Ranch. A group was formed who were ready to fight. The manner of the attack displayed that someone in the group had knowledge of the country near the ranch. Yontocket was the location of the tribes arrival on the coast and it was a village on the south side of the Smith River.  The Needash is the Tolowa's feather dance that occurs twice a year. This Needash was after fall harvest. Native Americans gathered from the surrounding areas to celebrate their religion. It was common for the tribes in the area (Chetko, Pistol River, Tolowa, Tututni, and some Rogue River tribes) to meet at the Center of the Tolowa World, Yontocket, at both the Summer and the Winter solstices. On the third night of the ten night gatherings, the town mob invaded the village and the massacre began.

One Tolowa man said that more than 450 people were killed in the attack. The massacre was conducted by a "company", a militia organized by American citizens of Crescent City.

At the time of the attack, the Tolowa had been engaged in a prayer ceremony. After the initial massacre, a Tolowa man reported that those responsible for the attack started a bonfire, in which they burned sacred ceremonial clothing and feathers, as well as babies, some of them still living.

The massacre 

When Peter H. Burnett found out where the survivors of the Battery Point Massacre were located, they formed a thirty-three man company. California Jack and his men said that they were "well armed and resolved upon the extermination of all Indians". The men trapped the Indians by encircling them. Just when the sun came up on the Eastern horizon, they opened fire at Yontocket. The Indians immediately came running out of their huts, armed with their bow and arrows, fighting for their lives. Their primitive weapons were no match for the modern weapons of the men. All around the men, the Indians attempted to escape, but there was no chance of surviving. The Indian men's scream was intermingled with the screams of the women and children, which caused even more confusion to the Indians. Hundreds of people were killed in the attack, but the men were not done yet. An eyewitness said "The people got all around them… Every time someone go out, never come back in… they set fire to the house, the Indians' house. You could see them just cutting heads off. They stick them things into them; pretty soon they pick them up and throw them right into the fire. Some of 'em tried to get away, run down the slough. Soon as they get down there, if they don't get 'em right away, they get 'em from the other side when they come up. Shoot 'em right there, waiting for them." After the attack, the men built a huge fire and threw almost everything the Indians had into it. They threw in the Indian's sacred ceremonial dresses into it and they even threw babies, some of which were still alive, in the fire too. Finally, Burnett's men burned Yontocket to the ground and only a few Indians were scarcely left alive. The men reported no intentional kills of women and children. So many victims were incinerated, submerged, or have floated away that the attackers could not obtain a complete body count. Sources estimated to only 150 lives lost that morning. This may have been an understatement and Tolowa sources insist that 600 people were massacred at Yontocket. This is ranked as one of the most lethal massacres in U.S. history.

After the massacre 

After the event, as many as 450 to 500 Tolowa people were recorded dead. Because their homes had burned down, the place received the name "Burnt Ranch."  The Yontocket Massacre decimated the cultural center of the Tolowa peoples. The Natives from the surrounding areas would gather there for their celebrations and discussions. The survivors of the massacre were forced to move to the village north of Smith's River called Howonquet. The slaughtering of the Tolowa people continued for some years. They were seemingly always caught at their Needash celebrations. These massacres caused some unrest which led in part to the Rogue River Indian war. Many Tolowa people were incarcerated at Battery Point in 1855 to withhold them from joining an uprising led by their chief. Adding to the number of dead from the Yontocket Massacre and the Battery Point Attack are many more in the following years. They are the Chetko Massacre with 24 dead, the Smith creek massacre with 7 dead, the Howonquet Massacre with 70 dead, and the Stundossun Massacre with 300 dead. In total, 902 Tolowa Native Americans were killed in 7 years. There are no records that any of the perpetrators were ever held accountable.

Little or no loss of life was reported on the American side.

See also
List of massacres in California
Achulet massacre

References

Lewis, David G. "The Most Persistent Attempt to Exterminate the Tribes, Beginning with the Yontocket Massacre 1853." NDNHISTORYRESEARCH, 21 Aug. 2017.
Madley, Benjamin. An American Genocide: the United States and the California Indian Catastrophe, 1846-1873. Yale University Press, 2017. (Link at Google Books)
Lewis, David G. "Tolowa Dee-Ni Fish Camp & Chronology." NDNHISTORYRESEARCH, NDNHISTORYRESEARCH, 25 Nov. 2017, ndnhistoryresearch.com/2015/08/30/dee-ni-tolowa-fish-camp-chronology/.

Conflicts in 1853
Genocidal massacres
Massacres of Native Americans
Tolowa
History of Del Norte County, California
Native American history of California
1853 in California
History of racism in California
California genocide